Sacred Heart Cathedral Preparatory, commonly known as SHC or SH, is a Catholic school located in the Cathedral Hill neighborhood of San Francisco, California. Founded in 1852, Sacred Heart Cathedral is the oldest Catholic secondary school and was the first co-ed Catholic high school in San Francisco.

SHC is owned by the Roman Catholic Archdiocese of San Francisco.

History 
Sacred Heart Cathedral Preparatory was formed by a merger between two single-sex schools — St. Vincent's and Sacred Heart High School.

St. Vincent's was founded in  1852 as an orphanage and a girls' day school by five sisters of the Daughters of Charity. In 1868, the Christian Brothers would open St. Peter’s Parochial School, which would eventually be renamed to Sacred Heart High School, to accommodate the growing elementary-aged population. Both campuses would be destroyed during the 1906 San Francisco Earthquake.
St. Vincent’s school would eventually be rebuilt, and moved three more times, finally settling on the corner of Gough and Geary streets in 1938. In 1966, the St. Vincent’s would be razed to make way for St. Mary's Cathedral, rebuilt adjacent to it, then renamed Cathedral High School.

The schools would merge together in 1987 into  Sacred Heart Cathedral Preparatory, after having collaborated together since 1967.

Facilities 
The school is located in San Francisco's Western Addition, with the two academic buildings located on the corner of Gough and Ellis Streets. A field used by the school's athletic teams for practice is also located on the corner of Gough and Eddy Streets.

De Paul Campus for the Arts
On the northwest corner of the intersection is the former Cathedral High School building, now named the De Paul Campus for the Arts in honor of St. Vincent de Paul. It houses the Sister Caroline Collins, DC, Theater, opened in fall of 2010; freshman lockers; the history, visual and performing arts, and Language Other than English (LOTE) departments. Starting in 2020, the DePaul Campus underwent renovations to modernize the front lobby. These renovations are ongoing.

The building adjoins San Francisco's Cathedral of Saint Mary of the Assumption; the school's former building was razed by the Archdiocese of San Francisco to make room for the construction of the new Cathedral. The cathedral's rectory is adjacent to the De Paul Campus, but there is no access to it from the school; the entrance is located on the northeast corner entrance of the campus. Pope John Paul II stayed in the rectory at the De Paul Campus during his trip to San Francisco in 1987, which is marked by a plaque at the entrance of the rectory.

La Salle campus
The La Salle campus is named in honor of St. John Baptist de La Salle. This campus has a six story building which houses school administration offices, the library, the Community Life Center, and the English, Mathematics, Science, and Religion departments. The library occupies the entire sixth story, except for a small chapel and veranda.

Student Life Center
The Sister Teresa Piro, DC, Student Life Center, completed in 2004 at an estimated cost of $16 million, houses a 1,500-seat athletic gym (called the Pavilion) and 1,000-seat Dining Hall.  The building is adjoined to an older facility housing a gymnasium, weight room, fitness center, and robotics lab.

Tuition and enrollment
Tuition at SHC costs $22,000 per student in the 2021-2022 term. SHC provides an array of courses, including college preparatory, honors, and Advanced Placement classes. All students are required to take English and Religious Studies for four years, as well as three years of Math and Social Studies. SHC uses a tracking system for math, with students typically being placed on one of three tracks in their freshman years. Most students additionally opt to take three or four years of Science and a foreign language, and one year of a visual or performing art. Sacred Heart Cathedral enrolls approximately 1,300 students from San Francisco and its suburbs.

Athletics
The athletic teams, known as the Fightin' Irish, compete in the West Catholic Athletic League. There are 22 teams and 53 sport levels for boys and girls at SHC split into Fall, Winter, and Spring seasons.

In the 2021-2022 school year, Sacred Heart Cathedral claimed its first CIF football title in school history after winning the Division 4-A state championship game.

Rivalry with Saint Ignatius College Preparatory

Sacred Heart Cathedral's traditional rival is Saint Ignatius College Preparatory, also located in San Francisco. The SH-SI rivalry began with a rugby game on St. Patrick's Day in 1893. SH and SI compete against each other in football, basketball, baseball, and volleyball for the Bruce-Mahoney Trophy, which is named after Bill Bruce of SI and Jerry Mahoney of SH, alumni who died in World War II.  SI has a significant edge over SH, with a winning record of 53-20-3 for the trophy.

Notable alumni
James J. Corbett, 1880 - Professional boxer
Harry Heilmann, 1912 - Professional baseball player
Joe Cronin, 1924 - Professional baseball player, inducted into Hall of Fame and American League president
Bob Marshall, 1952 - Mayor of San Bruno, California (1980-1992)
Kevin Gogan, 1983 - Professional football player for the Dallas Cowboys, Los Angeles / Oakland Raiders, San Francisco 49ers, Miami Dolphins, and San Diego Chargers
Eric White, 1983 - Professional basketball player
Justin Love, 1996 - Professional basketball player
Shannon Rowbury, 2002 - United States Olympic Runner and outdoor distance medley relay record holder
Jason Hill, 2003 - Professional Football Player
Keith Ismael, 2016 - Professional football player for the Washington Commanders

See also

San Francisco high schools
Lasallian Educational Institutions

Notes and references

External links
Sacred Heart Cathedral Preparatory Website

Educational institutions established in 1852
Educational institutions established in 1874
San Francisco
Catholic secondary schools in California
High schools in San Francisco
Roman Catholic Archdiocese of San Francisco
Boys' schools in the United States
1874 establishments in California
1852 establishments in California